The BMW R25 is a Motorbike made by BMW with a single Cylinder engine placed upright in the frame. Production started in the beginning of 1950 and ended 1951. A total of 23,400 motorcycles of this type were produced. bmw-motorrad.com

R25